Kirrberg is a commune in the northwest of the Bas-Rhin department in Grand Est in north-eastern France.

History
The earliest surviving record, naming the village as Villa Teurino, dates from 512.   The first appearance of a precursor to the present name occurs in 1501 with the name Kirpberg.

During the Thirty Years' War the village was almost entirely destroyed by fire.

See also
 Communes of the Bas-Rhin department

References

Communes of Bas-Rhin
Bas-Rhin communes articles needing translation from French Wikipedia